Monsters of Myth and Legend II is a supplement for fantasy role-playing games published by Mayfair Games in 1989.

Contents
Monsters of Myth and Legend II is a supplement describing 75 monsters and deities from five different ethnic sources: African (drawn from many regions), Central and South American (from the Aztecs and Incas), Eskimo, Japanese, and "Mideast" (Sumerian and Persian).  It includes myths and legends, new spells, and new magic items.

Publication history
Monsters of Myth and Legend II was written by Laurel Nicholson and John Keefe, with a cover by Boris Vallejo, and illustrations by Timothy D. Zon, and was published by Mayfair Games in 1989 as a 96-page book.

Reception
Lawrence Schick, in his book Heroic Worlds, notes that "The Eskimo section breaks some new ground, but the rest are pretty standard."

Reviews
Games Review (Volume 2, Issue 5 - Feb 1990) 
GamesMaster International Issue 1 - Aug 1990

References

Fantasy role-playing game supplements
Role Aids
Role-playing game supplements introduced in 1989